George Martin Lott (October 16, 1906 – December 3, 1991) was an American tennis player and tennis coach who was born in Springfield, Illinois, United States.  Lott is mostly remembered as being one of the greatest doubles players of all time. He won the U.S. title five times with three different partners: John Hennessey in 1928; John Doeg in 1929 and 1930; and Les Stoefen in 1933 and 1934. At the U. S. championships singles in 1928, Lott beat Christian Boussus and John Doeg before losing to Frank Hunter in the semifinals. In 1931 Lott beat defending champion Doeg in the semi finals before losing to Ellsworth Vines in the final. In 1934 Lott became a touring professional, thereby giving up his amateur status and the ability to play in Grand Slam tournaments. In 1929 and 1930 he was ranked World No. 6 and No. 7 by A Wallis Myers; No. 6 by Pierre Gillon in 1930; and in 1931 was ranked No. 4 by Züricher Sport.

Lott was the men's tennis coach at DePaul University from 1969 until his death in Chicago on December 3, 1991. He had been inducted into the school's Athletics Hall of Fame in 1984.

He signed a professional contract in November 1934 with promoter Bill O'Brien and in January 1935, at Madison Square Garden, started a series of head-to-head matches against Bill Tilden and by March trailed him 5–26.

Lott was inducted into the International Tennis Hall of Fame in 1964.

Grand Slam finals

Singles (1 runner-up)

Doubles (8 titles, 1 runner-up)

Mixed doubles (4 titles, 1 runner-up)

Other tennis achievements
Davis Cup team member – 1928–31, 1933–34
The first player, and one of only four (Bobby Riggs, Mats Wilander and Roger Federer being the other three), to win the tournament now known as the Cincinnati Masters four times: 1924, 1925, 1927 and 1932. Also won the doubles title in 1924 (with Jack Harris) and 1925 (with Thomas McGlinn) and was a singles finalist in 1926 and a doubles finalist (with Thomas Johnson) in 1927.

References

External links 
 
 
 
 

1906 births
1991 deaths
American male tennis players
American tennis coaches
DePaul Blue Demons men's tennis coaches
French Championships (tennis) champions
Sportspeople from Springfield, Illinois
International Tennis Hall of Fame inductees
Tennis people from Illinois
United States National champions (tennis)
Wimbledon champions (pre-Open Era)
Grand Slam (tennis) champions in mixed doubles
Grand Slam (tennis) champions in men's doubles
Professional tennis players before the Open Era